Madame Tussauds Shanghai (上海杜莎夫人臘像館) is a wax museum located on the 10th floor of the New World Department Store, Nanjing Xi Road, Shanghai, China. Opened May 1, 2006 it was the second Madame Tussauds museum to open in Asia after Madame Tussauds Hong Kong. It offers a mix of Chinese and western figures, from film stars to athletes and world leaders.

Notable figures

References

Shanghai
Tourist attractions in Shanghai
Museums in Shanghai
2006 establishments in China
Museums established in 2006